Roshchino is a village in Krasnoarmeysky District, Primorsky Krai, Russia. As of the 2010 Census, its population was 3919.

References

External links
 Official site 

1931 establishments in Russia
Cities and towns in Primorsky Krai
Populated places established in 1931